Carl B. "Charley" Casperson (August 17, 1877 – July 7, 1953) was a member of the Wisconsin State Senate from 1923 to 1930. He was also a delegate to the 1924 Republican National Convention. He was born in Laketown, Wisconsin, and died in Frederic, Wisconsin. Casperson was in the lumber business. He was also involved with the banking and telephone business. In 1917, he served in the Wisconsin State Assembly. Casperson also served on the Polk County Board of Supervisors. He served on the school board and was the board clerk.

References

County supervisors in Wisconsin
School board members in Wisconsin
Republican Party members of the Wisconsin State Assembly
Republican Party Wisconsin state senators
1877 births
1953 deaths
People from Polk County, Wisconsin
Businesspeople from Wisconsin